Gustave Buchard (17 February 1890 – 18 February 1977) was a French fencer who took part in the 1920 Olympic Games in Antwerp. Bushard won two Olympic medals in fencing at the 1920 Summer Olympics in Antwerp. He came in third place in both the individual and team epee.

References

External links 
 Gustave Buchard - Stats (ABC)

1890 births
1977 deaths
Sportspeople from Le Havre
French male épée fencers
Fencers at the 1920 Summer Olympics
Olympic fencers of France
Olympic bronze medalists for France
Olympic medalists in fencing
Medalists at the 1920 Summer Olympics
20th-century French people